Poetic Champions Compose is the seventeenth studio album by Northern Irish singer-songwriter Van Morrison, released in 1987 on Mercury Records. It received generally positive reviews from critics, most of whom viewed it as adequate mood music.

Recording and composition
Poetic Champions Compose was recorded in summer 1987 at Wool Hall Studios in Beckington with Mick Glossop as engineer.
 
Morrison was quoted during this time period as saying "Psychologists will tell you that artists have to be in a state of despair before they produce great work, but I don't think that... In my case I know it doesn't create better work.  I produce better work if I'm content.  I can't create that feeling if I'm in a state of conflict." Johnny Rogan felt that it emphasized his "commitments to creating a more contemplative style of music" and that what came across most in the album was "Morrison's heightened sense of ecstasy, purification and renewal."

Morrison originally intended the album to consist wholly of jazz instrumental works, but later said that "when I did three numbers I thought, 'No, I don't wanna do that,' and changed my mind." Nonetheless, each side of the album opens with an instrumental, "Spanish Steps" and "Celtic Excavation", and the album closes with another, "Allow Me". As described by Brian Hinton: "It is an album which is more than the sum of its parts, exuding an overall sense of calm and optimism."

According to Hinton, "Spanish Steps" is "a tune as calm as a millpond."  Morrison's philosophy reading list is evident in "Alan Watts Blues", and Socrates and Plato are mentioned in "I Forgot That Love Existed", as well as Rudolf Steiner's  pronouncement about the importance of "thinking with the heart and feeling with the mind".  Fiachra Trench writes the string and woodwind arrangement on "The Mystery", which strikes a spiritual theme. The album features two love songs that have had an enduring popularity, "Queen of the Slipstream" and "Someone Like You". The only song not penned by Morrison is the Negro spiritual "Sometimes I Feel Like a Motherless Child". Writes Hinton, "It is 'Mother Ireland'  whom Van is missing and his world weary vocals are like sobs of pain."  "Give Me My Rapture" and "Did Ye Get Healed?" are powerful and optimistic statements of the deep spiritual priorities in Morrison's music; the latter became a concert staple.

Critical reception

In a contemporary review for The Village Voice, music critic Robert Christgau wrote that Poetic Champions Compose is somewhat dull but tasteful "dinner music" because "in his current spiritual state", Morrison "doesn't much care about interesting. He just wants to roll on, undulating from rhythmic hill to melodic dale." Rolling Stone magazine's Jimmy Guterman wrote that some of the music and lyrics sound boring and do nothing but set a mood, but even without any progression by Morrison, the album is "another worthy installment in his series of soulful, meditative explorations". Don McLeese from the Chicago Sun-Times said most of the songs "could be categorized as mood music. But musical moods are rarely this sublime". In a rave review, Audio magazine hailed it as a prime example of rock music being rendered on the then-new CD format, as the music is "grounded in superb instrumental and vocal performances captured in a way which reflects a sonic reality rather than a fabrication."

Poetic Champions Compose was voted the 21st best album of 1987 in The Village Voices annual Pazz & Jop critics poll. In a retrospective review for AllMusic, Stephen Thomas Erlewine said only a few songs distinguish themselves from the album's dulcet, arty mood and mid-tempo balladry, but concluded that "this record is warmer, stronger than many of its predecessors, one of his highlights from the '80s." Colin Larkin highlighted "Spanish Steps", "Sometimes I Feel Like a Motherless Child", and "Someone Like You" in The Encyclopedia of Popular Music (2006), finding the songs "moving". Rob Sheffield was less enthusiastic in The Rolling Stone Album Guide (2004), deeming the album one of several "cranky self-imitations" that plagued Morrison's "painful slump in the '80s".

Track listing
All songs written by Van Morrison except as noted.

Side one
"Spanish Steps" – 5:20
"The Mystery" – 5:16
"Queen of the Slipstream" – 4:55
"I Forgot That Love Existed" – 4:17
"Sometimes I Feel Like a Motherless Child" (traditional) – 4:27

Side two
"Celtic Excavation" – 3:17
"Someone Like You" – 4:06
"Alan Watts Blues" – 4:24
"Give Me My Rapture" – 3:44
"Did Ye Get Healed?" – 4:06
"Allow Me" – 3:53

Personnel

Musicians
Van Morrison – lead vocals, guitar, harmonica, alto saxophone
Neil Drinkwater – piano, synthesizer
Martin Drover – trumpet, flugelhorn
Roy Jones – drums, percussion
Steve Pearce – bass
Mick Cox – lead guitar on "I Forgot That Love Existed" & "Alan Watts Blues"
June Boyce – backing vocals
Fiachra Trench – organ on "Give Me My Rapture"
Richie Buckley – soprano saxophone, flute on "Sometimes I Feel Like a Motherless Child" & "The Mystery"
Kate St. John – oboe on "Sometimes I Feel Like a Motherless Child" & "The Mystery"

Production
Producer: Van Morrison
Engineer: Mick Glossop
Photography: Steve Rapport, Direct Art Green Ink.
Coordination: Sian Williams
String and Woodwind arrangements: Fiachra Trench
Synthesizer Programming: Paul Ridout

Charts

Certifications

Notes

References
Collis, John (1996). Inarticulate Speech of the Heart, Little Brown and Company, 
Heylin, Clinton (2003). Can You Feel the Silence? Van Morrison: A New Biography, Chicago Review Press, 
Hinton, Brian (1997). Celtic Crossroads: The Art of Van Morrison, Sanctuary, 
Rogan, Johnny (2006). Van Morrison: No Surrender, London:Vintage Books

External links 
 

Van Morrison albums
1987 albums
Mercury Records albums
Albums produced by Van Morrison